The 2022–23 season is the 91st in the history of FC Metz and their first season back in the second division since 2019. The club are participating in Ligue 2 and the Coupe de France.

Players

Current squad

Out on loan

Transfers

Pre-season and friendlies

Competitions

Overall record

Ligue 2

League table

Results summary

Results by round

Matches 
The league fixtures were announced on 17 June 2022.

Coupe de France

References 

FC Metz seasons
Metz